The 1981 Centennial Cup is the 11th Junior "A" 1981 ice hockey National Championship for the Canadian Junior A Hockey League.

The Centennial Cup was competed for by the winners of the Abbott Cup, Dudley Hewitt Cup, and the Callaghan Cup.

The tournament was hosted by the Cole Harbour Colts  in the city of Halifax, Nova Scotia.

The Playoffs

Round Robin

Results
Belleville Bulls defeated Cole Harbour Colts 5-3
Prince Albert Raiders defeated Cole Harbour Colts 7-2
Prince Albert Raiders defeated Belleville Bulls 4-1
Belleville Bulls defeated Cole Harbour Colts 5-3
Prince Albert Raiders defeated Cole Harbour Colts 9-3
Belleville Bulls defeated Prince Albert Raiders 6-4

Finals

Awards
Most Valuable Player: James Patrick (Prince Albert Raiders)
Top Scorer: Dave Tippett (Prince Albert Raiders)
Most Sportsmanlike Player: Mochie Friesen (Cole Harbour Colts)

All-Star Team
Forward
Dave Tippett (Prince Albert Raiders)
Greg Paslawski (Prince Albert Raiders)
Bill Watson (Prince Albert Raiders)
Defence
James Patrick (Prince Albert Raiders)
Mike Deodato (Belleville Bulls)
Goal
Dan Burnoiss (Belleville Bulls)

Roll of League Champions
AJHL: St. Albert Saints
BCJHL: Penticton Knights
CJHL: Gloucester Rangers
IJHL: Sherwood-Parkdale Metros
MJHL: St. Boniface Saints
MVJHL: Cole Harbour Colts
NBJHL: Moncton Beavers
NOJHL: Onaping Falls Huskies
OPJHL: Belleville Bulls
PCJHL: Prince George Spruce Kings
QJAHL:
SJHL: Prince Albert Raiders

See also
Abbott Cup
Anavet Cup
Canadian Junior A Hockey League
Doyle Cup
Dudley Hewitt Cup
Fred Page Cup
Mowat Cup
Royal Bank Cup

External links
Royal Bank Cup Website

1981
Cup